Fernand Martinaux (29 September 1928 – 15 March 2017) was a French swimmer. He competed in the men's 100 metre freestyle at the 1948 Summer Olympics.

References

External links
 

1928 births
2017 deaths
Olympic swimmers of France
Swimmers at the 1948 Summer Olympics
Place of birth missing
French male freestyle swimmers
20th-century French people
21st-century French people